Asha Parekh (born 2 October 1942) is a retired Indian actress, film director, and producer who appeared in many commercially successful films throughout her career. She was the highest paid actress of her time and was one of the most successful actresses of the 1960s and 1970s. She is considered one of the most influential actresses of all time in Hindi cinema. In 1992, she was honoured with the Padma Shri by the Government of India for her contribution to the field of cinema and also honoured with the Dadasaheb Phalke Award for 2020.

Early life 
Asha Parekh is a Gujarati born on 2 October 1942. Her mother, Sudha aka Salma Parekh, was a Dawoodi Bohra Shia Gujarati Muslim and her father, Bachubhai Parekh, was Hindu Gujarati. Her mother enrolled her in Indian classical dance classes at an early age and she learned from many teachers, including Pandit Bansilal Bharati.

Career 
Parekh started her career as a child artist under the screen name Baby Asha Parekh. Famed film director Bimal Roy saw her dance at a stage function and cast her at the age of ten in Maa (1952) and then repeated her in Baap Beti (1954). The latter film's failure disappointed her, and even though she did a few more child roles, she quit to resume her schooling. At sixteen she decided to try acting again, and to make her debut as a heroine, but she was rejected from Vijay Bhatt's Goonj Uthi Shehnai (1959) in favour of actress Ameeta, because the filmmaker claimed she was not star material. Precisely eight days later, film producer Subodh Mukherjee and writer-director Nasir Hussain cast her as the heroine in Dil Deke Dekho (1959), opposite Shammi Kapoor, which made her a huge star.

It also started a long association with Hussain who cast her as his heroine in six more films: Jab Pyar Kisi Se Hota Hai (1961), Phir Wohi Dil Laya Hoon (1963), Teesri Manzil (1966), Baharon Ke Sapne (1967), Pyar Ka Mausam (1969), and Caravan (1971). She also did a cameo in his 1984 film Manzil Manzil. Hussain also got her involved in distribution of 21 films, starting with Baharon Ke Sapne (1967). Parekh was primarily known as a glamour girl/excellent dancer/tomboy in most of her films, until director Raj Khosla gave her a serious image by casting her in tragedienne roles in three of her favourite films; Do Badan (1966), Chirag (1969) and Main Tulsi Tere Aangan Ki (1978). Director Shakti Samanta gave her more dramatic roles in her other favourite films, Pagla Kahin Ka (1970) and Kati Patang (1970); the latter earned her the Filmfare Award for Best Actress.

Many important directors repeatedly cast her in several of their films, including Vijay Anand and Mohan Segal. Parekh acted in her mother tongue by starring in three Gujarati films at the height of her fame in Hindi films, the first being Akhand Saubhagyavati (1963), which became a huge hit. She also acted in some Punjabi films, such as Kankan De Ohle (1971) opposite Dharmendra and Lambhardarni (1976) with Dara Singh, as well as the hit Kannada film Sharavegada Saradara (1989). As a leading heroine, she formed popular onscreen pairings with actors including Dev Anand, Shammi Kapoor and Rajesh Khanna.

After her days as a leading lady ended, Parekh took on supporting roles as bhabhi (sister-in-law) and mother. A notable film she did in which she played such a part is Kaalia (1981), which is the only film in which she shared screen space with Amitabh Bachchan. But she called these roles the "awkward phase" of her career. So she stopped acting in films, and her friends recommended that she become a television director. She took their advice and became a television director in the early 1990s with the Gujarati serial Jyoti. She formed a production company, Akruti, and produced serials like Palash ke Phool, Baaje Payal, Kora Kagaz and a comedy, Dal Mein Kaala. She was the president of the Cine Artistes' Association from 1994 to 2000. Parekh was the first female chairperson of the Central Board of Film Certification (Censor Board) of India. She held the post from 1998 to 2001 for which she received no salary, but plenty of controversy for censoring films and for not giving clearance to Shekhar Kapur's Elizabeth. Later, she became the treasurer of the Cine and Television Artists Association (CINTAA) and was later elected as one of its office-bearers. 

In 2008, she was a judge on the reality show Tyohaar Dhamaaka on the Indian entertainment channel 9X.

In 2017, her autobiography (co-written by Khalid Mohamed) titled The Hit Girl was released.

Personal life 

Parekh has remained unmarried, claiming that her reputation of being unapproachable made people hesitate in asking for her hand in marriage. In her memoir The Hit Girl, she confirmed rumours that she was romantically involved with director Nasir Hussain who was already married, but out of respect for both their families, she couldn't marry him. Previously, Parekh would only state that she had a longtime boyfriend but declined to elaborate on the relationship, only stating that "it was nice while it lasted." She said she had not seen Nasir Hussain during the last year of his life, as he became reclusive because of his wife's death, but she did speak to him the day before he died in 2002. She almost married an Indian professor living in America, but he didn't want to give up his girlfriend, so she called off their wedding plans. She had also tried to adopt a child, but he had birth defects, and the doctors refused to let her adopt him.

Today, Parekh concentrates on her dance academy Kara Bhavan. She has a hospital in her name in Santacruz, Mumbai, called "BCJ Hospital and Asha Parekh Research Centre", as she had donated for the medical and surgical wing. She has stated that the hospital had been closed and reopened various times.

Filmography

Awards and nominations 

Parekh received the Filmfare Lifetime Achievement Award in 2002. She has continued to receive other Lifetime Achievement Awards: the Kalakar Award in 2004; the International Indian Film Academy Awards in 2006; the Pune International Film Festival Award in 2007; and the Ninth Annual Bollywood Award in Long Island, New York in 2007. She received the Living Legend Award from the Federation of Indian Chambers of Commerce & Industry (FICCI).

In 2016, Nitin Gadkari, Union Minister for Road Transport and Highways, said that Parekh had approached him at his Mumbai residence, climbing 12 floors of steps, to recommend her name for the Padma Bhushan, the third-highest civillian award. The claim was widely reported, however Parekh said she never lobbied for the award, and refused to say more on the matter. In her memoir The Hit Girl published a year later, Parekh said that meeting the minister was the "worst mistake" of her life. She said she had been hurt by the minister's claim, and recounted a different version of the event. Parekh had been awarded the Padma Shri in 1992. A close friend had arranged a meeting with the minister and suggested her to seek an upgrade of the award.

A chronological listing of awards and nominations is as follows:
 Won – Gujarat State Award for Best Actress for Akhand Saubhagyavati (1963)
 Nominated – Filmfare Award for Best Actress for Chirag (1969)
 Won – Filmfare Award for Best Actress for Kati Patang (1971)
 Nominated – Filmfare Award for Best Supporting Actress for Udhar Ka Sindur (1976)
 Nominated – Filmfare Award for Best Supporting Actress for Main Tulsi Tere Aangan Ki (1978)
 Padma Shri awarded in the Arts (1992)
 Filmfare Lifetime Achievement Award (2002)
 Indian Motion Picture Producers' Association (IMPPA) felicitated Parekh for her outstanding contribution to the Indian film industry (2003)
 Kalakar Awards – Lifetime Achievement Award (2004)
 International Indian Film Academy Awards for outstanding achievement in Indian cinema (2006)
 Saptarang Ke Saptashee Award (2006)
 Gujarati Association of North America (GANA)'s First International Gujarati Convention—Lifetime Achievement Award (2006)
 Pune International Film Festival—Lifetime Achievement Award (2007)
 Bollywood Award—Lifetime Achievement Award (2007)
 Living Legend Award from the Federation of Indian Chambers of Commerce and Industry (FICCI).
 Film Federation of India honoured Parekh at its Golden Jubilee celebration ceremony (2008)
 Sahyadri Navratna Award given to Parekh for being a "woman of substance" (2008)
 Solitaire for Life Award from the ABN Amro Solitaire Design Awards show (2008)
 Nashik International Film Festival—Lifetime Achievement Award (2009)
 'Lachchu Mahraj Puraskar' Award for Parekh's contribution to dance and acting (2009)
 40th International Film Festival of India felicitated Parekh for completing 50 years in Hindi cinema (2009)
 'Legends Live Forever Award' from the Immortal Memories Event (2009)
 Golden Laurel Award—Ninth Gr8 Women Achievers Awards (2010)
 Prakarti Ratan Award (2010)
 Jaipur International Film Festival—Lifetime Achievement Award (2011)
 Bhishma Award by the Ashram Arts Academy (2012)
 Kalakar Awards – Living Legend Award (2018)
 "Walk of the Stars" honour, where a tile bears her handprint (2013)
 Stardust-Lifetime Achievement Award (2015)
 Most Stylish Lifetime Style Icon Award—Hindustan Times Most Stylish Awards (2017)
 Second Best Book Award for her memoir "The Hit Girl" at the 5th annual Pune International Literary Festival (PILF) (2017)
 Bimal Roy Memorial Lifetime Achievement Award (2019)
 Global Cinema Festival-Lifetime Achievement Award (2020)
 Dadasaheb Phalke International Film Festival Award for "Outstanding Contribution to Film Industry" (2022)
 Master Deenanath Puraskar Award for "dedicated services in the field of cinema" (2022)
 Dadasaheb Phalke Award presented for the year 2020 by Government of India (2022)

References

Further reading

External links 

 
 Asha Parekh - a profile by Dinesh Raheja

1942 births
Living people
Dadasaheb Phalke Award recipients
Recipients of the Padma Shri in arts
Filmfare Lifetime Achievement Award winners
Actresses in Hindi cinema
Actresses from Mumbai
Indian film actresses
Indian women film producers
Indian women film directors
20th-century Indian film directors
20th-century Indian actresses
Film producers from Mumbai
Film directors from Mumbai
Gujarati people
Dawoodi Bohras
Businesswomen from Maharashtra